Lafayette transmitter was a large facility used for transatlantic VLF-transmission, located at Marcheprime, Aquitaine, France.  The Lafayette transmitter used an antenna, which was carried by eight free-standing lattice towers (each 250 metres tall) with triangular cross-sections, which were the second tallest free-standing towers in the world. The 250-meter-high tripod pylons were supplied by Pitt-Des Moines Co steelworks in Pittsburgh, Pennsylvania and transported by water to Bordeaux.

In 1944 the installations of Lafayette transmitter were destroyed by retreating German troops. The last of the towers was demolished in 1953.

See also
 Lattice tower
 List of tallest structures in France
 List of famous transmission sites

References

External links
 https://web.archive.org/web/20070609135453/http://dspt.club.fr/lafayette.htm
 http://skyscraperpage.com/diagrams/?b63230
 https://web.archive.org/web/20070929132104/http://www.u-e-f.net/uef-histoire/croixhins.htm

Lattice towers
Towers in France
1920 establishments in France
Transmitter sites in France
Former radio masts and towers
Demolished buildings and structures in France
1953 disestablishments in France